Irshad Hussain is a Pakistani Scientist in the field of chemistry and among the few pioneers to initiate nanomaterials research in Pakistan.

He is among the founding members of SBA School of Science & Engineering and played a key role to lead the development of Chemistry Department at Lahore University of Management Sciences (during 2010–2016). He is a Tenured Professor at the Department of Chemistry and Chemical Engineering, SBA School of Science & Engineering, Lahore University of Management Sciences, and has previously also served as a Professor of Renewable Energy Engineering at the US–Pakistan Center for Advanced Studies in Energy at the University of Engineering and Technology, Peshawar , while on sabbatical leave in 2017. Hussain has also served as the Chair of National Nanotech Experts Panel at Pakistan Council for Science & Technology in 2015 and was awarded gold medals in Chemistry by Pakistan Academy of Sciences (PAS) in 2007 (Prof. Atta-ur-Rahman Gold Medal in Chemistry) and 2014 (PAS Gold Medal in Chemistry). Currently, he is also leading National Core Group of Nanotechnology under Prime Minister Task Force on Science & Technology, Govt. of Pakistan.

Early life and education
Hussain was born and raised in a remote village Mauza Sadhana, Ahmedpur Sial, of Jhang, Pakistan. He received his early education from Samandoana and Ahmed Pur Sial, District Jhang. Then he moved to Multan and obtained F.Sc. and B.Sc. degree from Government Emerson College Bosan Road Multan. He received his MSc degree in chemistry from Quaid-i-Azam University, Islamabad in 1993, and afterwards worked in the groups of Atta-ur-Rahman and Muhammad Iqbal Choudhary at Hussain Ebrahim Jamal Research Institute of Chemistry, University of Karachi. He joined NIBGE, Faisalabad, in 1997 and during his service at NIBGE, completed PhD (Chemistry) in 2005 from the University of Liverpool, UK, under the supervision of Andrew Ian Cooper and Mathias Brust.

Career
Hussain joined National Institute for Biotechnology and Genetic Engineering, Faisalabad, in 1997 as a Scientific Officer and was promoted to Senior Scientific Officer in 2001. He was the Founding Project Director of a ~US$2.5 Million project to initiate Nanobiotechnology research during 2005–2008. In Feb. 2008, he joined the Chemistry Department at SBA School of Science & Engineering, Lahore University of Management Sciences  and led the Chemistry department as chair from 2010 to December 31, 2016. While on sabbatical leave in 2017, Hussain served as a Professor of Renewable Energy Systems at US-Pakistan Center for Advanced Studies in Energy, University of Engineering & Technology, Peshawar, and as a Foreign Professor (Oct. 25 - Nov. 24, 2017) at the School of Chemistry & Chemical Engineering, Huazhong University of Science and Technology, Wuhan, China.

Research
The focus of Hussain's research group is on the synthesis of customized metal/metal oxide nanoparticles/nanoclusters for applications in diverse fields including biomedical sciences, energy technologies, environment and catalysis. He has established his research mark by developing reproducible methods for the synthesis of fairly uniform metal nanoparticles/nanoclusters with controlled size, shape and surface chemistry and using them as building blocks to develop new nanostructured materials with unique chemical and physical properties for applications in biomedical sciences, renewable energy technologies, environment & catalysis. He has published over 80 research articles in prominent journals including Nature Materials, Science Advances, Angewandte Chemie - Int. Ed., Advanced Materials, Journal of the American Chemical Society, Small, ChemCommun, Langmuir, and Nanoscale etc.

Awards and honours
 2022 - Fellow, International Engineering & Technology Institute (IETI)
 2021 - Fellow (elected), Pakistan Academy of Sciences, Pakistan
 2021 - Fellow, Royal Society of Chemistry, UK (FRSC)
 2020 - to date: Chair, National Core Group of Nanotechnology, PM Task Force on Science & Technology (Pakistan)
 2020 - to date: Member, National Core Group of Chemistry, PM Task Force on Science & Technology (Pakistan)
 2006-2019:  Research Productivity awards by PCST, Ministry of Science and Technology (Pakistan)
 2016: Charles Wallace visiting fellow at the University of Cambridge UK
 2014: Chair of National Nanotech Foresight Committee constituted by Pakistan Council for Science and Technology (PCST)
 2014: Pakistan Academy of Sciences Gold Medal in Chemistry
2014: Honored as the first scientist interviewed at the launch of Facebook page of Bioconjugate Chemistry.
 2013: Fellow of the Chemical Society of Pakistan
 2007: Prof. Dr. Atta-ur-Rehman Gold Medal in Chemistry by Pakistan Academy of Sciences.
 2001-2005: PhD fellowship award by Ministry of Science & Technology, Govt. of Pakistan, to study in UK

Selected publications 
'Immobilized covalent triazine frameworks films as effective photocatalysts for hydrogen evolution reaction' Nature Communications 2021
'Fundamentals and Design-Led Synthesis of Emulsion-Templated Porous Materials for Environmental Applications' Advanced Science 2021
'Facile preparation of silver nanocluster self-assemblies with aggregation-induced emission by equilibrium shifting' Nanoscale 2021
'Recent Advances in Electrocatalysts toward Alcohol-Assisted, Energy-Saving Hydrogen Production' ACS Applied Energy Materials 2021
'Hyperbranched Polyethylenimine-Tethered Multiple Emulsion-Templated Hierarchically Macroporous Poly(acrylic acid)–Al2O3 Nanocomposite Beads for Water Purification' ACS Applied Materials & Interfaces 2021
'Eco-Friendly Phosphorus and Nitrogen-Rich Inorganic–Organic Hybrid Hypercross-linked Porous Polymers via a Low-Cost Strategy' Macromolecules 2021
'Nanoparticles-assisted delivery of antiviral-siRNA as inhalable treatment for human respiratory viruses: A candidate approach against SARS-COV-2' ACS Applied Materials & Interfaces 2021
'Supported polyoxometalates as emerging nanohybrid materials for photochemical and photoelectrochemical water splitting' Nanophotonics 2021
'Nanoparticles-assisted delivery of antiviral-siRNA as inhalable treatment for human respiratory viruses: A candidate approach against SARS-COV-2' Nano Select 2021
'Bactericidal Effect of 5-Mercapto-2-nitrobenzoic Acid-Coated Silver Nanoclusters against Multidrug-Resistant Neisseria gonorrhoeae' ACS Applied Materials and Interfaces, 2020.
'Controlled development of higher-dimensional nanostructured copper oxide thin films as binder free electrocatalysts for oxygen evolution reaction' International Journal of Hydrogen Energy, 2020.
'Controlled Assembly of Cu/Co‐oxide Beaded Nanoclusters on Thiolated Graphene Oxide Nanosheets for High Performance Oxygen Evolution Reaction' Chemistry - A European Journal, 2020.
'Controlled engineering of nickel carbide induced N-enriched carbon nanotubes for hydrogen and oxygen evolution reactions in wide pH range' Electrochimica Acta, 2020.
'Nano Silver Mitigates Biofilm Formation via FapC Amyloidosis Inhibition' Small, 2020.
'Ultrasmall Co@Co(OH)2 Nanoclusters Embedded in N‐Enriched Mesoporous Carbon Network as Efficient Electrocatalysts for Durable Water Oxidation' ChemSusChem, 2019
'Fabrication of emulsion-templated poly(vinylsulfonic acid)−Ag nanocomposite beads with hierarchical multimodal porosity for water cleanup' Langmuir, 2019
'Magnetic Hierarchically Macroporous Emulsion-Templated Poly(acrylic acid)-Iron Oxide Nanocomposite Beads for Water Remediation' Langmuir, 2019
'Metal Nanoclusters: New Paradigm in Catalysis for Water Splitting, Solar and Chemical Energy Conversion' ChemSusChem, 2019
'Porous hypercrosslinked polymer-TiO2-graphene composite photocatalysts for visible-light-driven CO2 conversion' Nature Communications, 2019.
'Ultrasmall Ni/NiO nanoclusters on thiol-functionalized and exfoliated graphene oxide nanosheets for durable oxygen evolution reaction' ACS Applied Energy Materials, 2019.
'An efficient synthesis of ultrafine gold nanoparticles with tunable sizes in a hyper-crosslinked polymer for nitrophenol reduction' ACS Applied Nanomaterials, 2019.
'PVP-templated highly luminescent copper nanoclusters for sensing trinitrophenol and living cell imaging' Nanoscale, 2019.
'Cationic Silver Nanoclusters as Potent Antimicrobials against Multidrug-Resistant Bacteria' ACS Omega, 2018.
'Metal Nanoclusters: New Paradigm in Catalysis for Water Splitting, Solar and Chemical Energy Conversion' ChemSusChem, 2018.
'Polymeric nanocapsules embedded with ultra-small silver nanoclusters for synergistic pharmacology and improved oral delivery of docetaxel' Scientific Reports, 2018.
'Layered microporous polymers by solvent knitting method' Science Advances, 2017.
 'Dopamine coated Fe3O4 nanoparticles as enzyme mimics for the sensitive detection of bacteria' Chemical Communications, 2017.
 'Cell to rodent: toxicological profiling of folate grafted thiomer enveloped nanoliposomes' Toxicology Research, 2017.
 'Synthesis of water-soluble and highly fluorescent gold nanoclusters for Fe3+sensing in living cells using fluorescence imaging' Journal of Materials Chemistry B, 2017.
 'Development of silver nanoparticles decorated emulsion-templated hierarchically porous poly(1-vinylimidazole) beads for water treatment' ACS Applied Materials & Interfaces, 2017.
 'Facile method to synthesize dopamine-capped mixed ferrite nanoparticles and their peroxidase-like activity' Journal of Physics D: Applied Physics, 2017.
 'Gold nanoparticles supported on fibrous silica nanospheres (KCC-1) as efficient heterogeneous catalysts for CO oxidation.' ChemCatChem, 2016.
 'Folate grafted thiolated chitosan enveloped nanoliposomes with enhanced oral bioavailability and anticancer activity of docetaxel.' Journal of Materials Chemistry B, 2016.
 'Atomically monodisperse nickel nanoclusters as highly active electrocatalysts for water oxidation' Nanoscale, 2016.
 'Design and utility of metal/metal oxide nanoparticles mediated by thioether end-functionalized polymeric ligands.' Polymers, 2016.
 'Lecithin-gold hybrid nanocarriers as efficient and pH selective vehicles for oral delivery of diacerein—In-vitro and in-vivo study' Colloids and Surfaces B, 2016.
 'Synthesis, characterization and evaluation of lecithin based nanocarriers for enhanced pharmacological and oral pharmacokinetic profile of amphotericin B' Journal of Materials Chemistry B, 2015.
 'Metal nanoparticles assisted polymerase chain reaction for strain typing of Salmonella typhi' Analyst, 2015.
 'From porous gold nanocups to porous nanospheres and solid particles – A new synthetic approach' Journal of Colloid and Interface Science, 2015.
 'Lysozyme-coated silver nanoparticles for differentiating bacterial strains on the basis of antibacterial activity' Nanoscale Research Letters, 2014.
 'Multifunctional microporous organic polymers' Journal of Materials Chemistry A, 2014.
 'Synthesis of cellulose–metal nanoparticle composites: development and comparison of different protocols' cellulose, 2014.
 'Highly water-soluble magnetic iron oxide (Fe3O4) nanoparticles for drug delivery: Enhanced in vitro therapeutic efficacy of doxorubicin and MION conjugates' Journal of Materials Chemistry B, 2013.
 'Protein-mediated synthesis, pH-induced reversible agglomeration, toxicity and cellular interaction of silver nanoparticles' Colloids and Surfaces B, 2013.
 'Synthesis of highly stable and water dispersible Ag44(SR)30 nanoclusters' Journal of Materials Chemistry A, 2013.
 'Facile and surfactant-free preparation of highly blue fluorescent gold nanoclusters in organic media.' Journal of Physical Chemistry C, 2012.
 'Control of surface tension at liquid-liquid interfaces using nanoparticles and nanoparticle-protein complexes.' Langmuir, 2012.
 'Facile preparation of size-controlled gold nanoparticles using versatile and end-functionalized thioether polymer ligands' Nanoscale, 2011.
 'In-Situ growth of gold nanoparticles on latent fingerprints – From forensic applications to inkjet printed nanoparticle patterns' Nanoscale, 2010.
 'Emulsions-directed assembly of gold nanoparticles to molecularly-linked and size-controlled spherical aggregates' Journal of Colloid and Interface Science, 2010.
 'Controlled step growth of molecularly linked gold nanoparticles – from metallic monomers to dimers to polymeric nanoparticle chains' Langmuir, 2009.
 'Freeze-align and heat-fuse: Microwires and networks from nanoparticle suspensions' Angewandte Chemie, 2008.
 'Design of polymeric stabilizers for size-controlled synthesis of monodisperse gold nanoparticles in water' Langmuir, 2007.
 'Formation of spherical nanostructures by the controlled aggregation of gold colloids' in Langmuir, 2006.
 'Aligned two-and three-dimensional structures by directional freezing of polymers and nanoparticles' Nature Materials, 2005.
 'Size-controlled synthesis of near-monodisperse gold nanoparticles in the 1-4 nm range using polymeric stabilizers' JACS,  2005.
 'Fullerene-linked Pt assemblies' Chemical Communications, 2004.
 'Rational and combinatorial design of peptide capping ligands for gold nanoparticles' JACS, 2004.
 'Emulsion-templated gold beads using gold nanoparticles as building blocks' Advanced Materials, 2004 (Front cover art).
 'Preparation of acrylate-stabilized gold and silver hydrosols and gold-polymer composite films' Langmuir, 2003.

References 

Year of birth missing (living people)
Living people
Pakistani chemists
People from Jhang District
Academic staff of Lahore University of Management Sciences
Alumni of the University of Liverpool
Quaid-i-Azam University alumni